Nakhchivan Automobile Plant, better known as NAZ, is an automobile manufacturer in the Nakhchivan Autonomous Republic of Azerbaijan.

History

Nakhchivan Automobile Factory was founded in 2006. It was put into operation on January 11, 2010. Baku 2015 European Games signed NAZ as Official Supporter. Since April, 2019 NAZ became part of Cahan Holding.

Facilities

Production
Annual output of the factory is 5000 unit cars. In the first stage 108 unit of  passenger cars of 4 different Lifan Group models were assembled and was sold as NAZ-LIFAN brand. These are NAZ-LIFAN 620 (sedan), NAZ-LIFAN 520 (sedan), NAZ-LIFAN 520i (hatchback) and NAZ-LIFAN 320 (hatchback) models. Since 2012, the factory began production of the new SUV-type crossover NAZ-LIFAN X60. NAZ-LIFAN 620 models are already equipped with automatic gearbox. At the end of 2012 for marketing purposes a small batch  of commercial vehicles were assembled and put in our showrooms. They are LF5028 model cargo-van and LF1022 model light duty truck with 800 kg carrying capacity, also LF6401 model minibus (1+6 seated). At the end of 2013 year factory will start the production of the new NAZ-LIFAN 720 model, also NAZ-LIFAN 630 and 330 models – the renewed versions of NAZ-LIFAN 620 and 320 models will be presented to the customers. So far, more than 2,000 units of NAZ-LIFAN cars were produced in the factory.

Models
 Lifan 320
 Lifan 7130
 Lifan 7160
 Lifan 7161 A
 Lifan 7160 L1
 Lifan 7162
 Lifan 7162 C
 Lifan 650
 Lifan X60
 Lifan Foison
 Lifan 820 Premium
 Lifan X70
 Lifan L7
 FAW T80
 FAW T33
 Changan Minivan 
 Changan Pickup

Gallery

See also
 Ganja Auto Plant
 Azsamand

References

External links
 NAZ Official Website

Vehicle manufacturing companies established in 2006
Nakhchivan (city)
2006 establishments in Azerbaijan
Car manufacturers of Azerbaijan